Yuliya Andriyivna Levchenko or Yuliia Andriivna Levchenko (born 28 November 1997) is a Ukrainian high jumper. She won the silver medal at the 2017 World Championships in Athletics. Indoors at European level, Levchenko claimed bronze in 2017 and silver in 2019. She was the 2017 European Under-23 champion.

Levchenko earned gold at the 2014 Youth Olympics and bronze at the 2016 World U20 Championships.

Career
Levchenko competed at the 2016 Olympic Games and did not reach the final. She was the 2017 European U23 Championships gold medalist and the 2017 World Championships silver medalist. She was ranked second in the world for the 2017 season. Also in 2017, she was named the European Athletics Rising Star of the Year.

Levchenko competed at the 2020 Olympic Games, where she finished eighth. Her personal bests in the high jump are 2.02 metres outdoors (2019) and 2.00 metres indoors (2019).

Competition record

References

 

1997 births
Living people
People from Bakhmut
Ukrainian female high jumpers
Athletes (track and field) at the 2016 Summer Olympics
Athletes (track and field) at the 2020 Summer Olympics
Olympic athletes of Ukraine
World Athletics Championships medalists
World Athletics Championships athletes for Ukraine
Athletes (track and field) at the 2014 Summer Youth Olympics
Youth Olympic gold medalists in athletics (track and field)
Youth Olympic gold medalists for Ukraine
Ukrainian Athletics Championships winners
European Athletics Rising Star of the Year winners
Sportspeople from Donetsk Oblast
21st-century Ukrainian women